The Brayford Pool is a natural lake formed from a widening of the River Witham in the centre of the city of Lincoln in England. It was used as a port by the Romans – who connected it to the River Trent by constructing the Foss Dyke – and has a long industrial heritage.

Today, the waterfront surrounding the pool is home to a range of hotels, restaurants, bars, entertainment venues and a modern University (the University of Lincoln). There is also a year-long programme of events on the waterfront including vehicle displays, music evenings and carnival parades.

History

The Pool has been the focus of Lincoln's urban regeneration since the early 1990s. It is now overlooked by bars,  restaurants, a cinema and, most significantly, the University of Lincoln.  The only reminder of the past is the Royal William public house, a traditional pub housed inside a listed building.  The Pool is used as a marina by houseboats and pleasure craft, as well as by anglers and kayakers.

The Brayford Pool is known for its large population of mute swans (Cygnus olor). The swans made the news in 2004, over concerns about the animals' diet and overall health, as well as the appearance on the Pool of a number of Australian black swans (Cygnus atratus).

Also located on the Brayford Pool is the Lincoln Unit of the Sea Cadet Corps - T.S. Wrangler.

Brayford Island is in the Pool.

References

External links

 Visit Lincoln: Brayford Waterfront

Lincoln, England
Ports and harbours of Lincolnshire